Endiang is a hamlet in Alberta, Canada within the County of Stettler No. 6.

Although Endiang enjoyed fair prosperity in the early years of the 20th century, the Great Depression, World War II, and better transportation have led to the depopulation of the local farming community, and with it, of the hamlet. In former years, Endiang was home to a post office, two general stores, two hardware stores, a bank, a train station, grain elevators, a hotel and pool hall, a gas station, a tractor dealership, a lumber yard, and all the other establishment expected in most communities. Today, Endiang is still home to a community hall and a restaurant.

The hamlet is located in Census Division No. 7 and in the federal riding of Crowfoot.

History 
A little known fact about Endiang is that during the cold war it was considered the place most likely for conflict between the U.S.S.R. and the U.S.A. to begin. If the Soviet Union were to have fired a missile first, and the American military were to respond, it was considered likely that the two missiles would collide over Endiang. This fact was immortalised in the poem "Armageddon at Endiang, Alberta".

An interesting bit of history is that the original settlement of Endiang was located about 5 kilometers northeast of the present hamlet and was established by William Foreman on his homestead in 1910. It was named for a summer resort hotel the Foreman family owned in the Muskoka Lakes region of Ontario, named "Endiang", from the Anishinaabe language Endaayaang, meaning "our home". The tiny settlement included a post office, a store, and a hall. When the CNR built a railroad through the area in 1925, it missed the original settlement, so with the aid of horse power, the buildings were moved to the new site of Endiang.

Endiang is also notable for being the home to the Shaben family, some of whom were involved in the establishment of the first mosque in Alberta.

NHL hockey player Darcy Tucker, who played for Montreal, Tampa Bay, Toronto, and Colorado, was raised in Endiang, and his family still resides there.

The history of the Endiang area was first recorded in local author Jean James' book This Was Endiang. In 2002 the history of the area was updated with family histories included in the book "Endiang - Our Home". The latest 650 page history book was the project of the Endiang History Book Committee.

The Endiang community celebrated their Centennial on July 23–25, 2010.

Geography 
Endiang is located on a plain bounded by ranges of hills to the west and south, and by Sullivan Lake, a large alkali lake to the east. The Chain Lakes lie to the southwest. Its geography and climate is similar to that of most other prairie areas of East-Central and Southern Alberta, experiencing cold winters broken up by Chinook winds, and warm, dry summers. In recent years, Endiang has experienced both extreme droughts and extreme wet conditions, having a great impact on the local farming community, although this sort of weather pattern is typical of other such areas found in Palliser's Triangle.

Together the two communities are commonly referred to as "Endmoor".

Demographics 

See also 
List of communities in Alberta
List of designated places in Alberta
List of hamlets in Alberta

References 

Hamlets in Alberta
Designated places in Alberta
County of Stettler No. 6